Dimitra Tsiliaskopoulos, better known as Dimi Poulos is an Australian soccer goalkeeper who last played for Western Sydney Wanderers in the W-League, as an injury replacement for Young Matildas goalkeeper Mackenzie Arnold.

While still at high school, Poulos played for the Wollongong Wolves in the New South Wales Women's League. Poulos played for the New South Wales Sapphires in the Australian Women's National Soccer League between 2002 and 2004.

Poulos played college soccer with the Winthrop Eagles between 2005 and 2008. She was inducted into the Winthrop Athletics Hall of Fame in 2015.

She played in the American W-League and the Spanish league.

References

Australian women's soccer players
Living people
Sydney FC (A-League Women) players
Western Sydney Wanderers FC (A-League Women) players
1984 births
Women's association football goalkeepers